Vatra means "hearth", "fireplace" in Albanian and Romanian, and "fire" in Serbo-Croatian.

The word vatra (alternatively votra, indefinite Albanian form: vatër/votër) is derived from Proto-Albanian *ōtar, obtained through the *o- to *vo-/*va- transformation which is observed exclusively in the Albanian language. It is related to or borrowed from Sarmato-Alanic, from Proto-Iranian *HáHtr̥š ("fire", cf. Atar). The ultimate origin is from Proto-Indo-European *h₂eh₁ter- ("fire").

Geography
 Vatra, Botoşani County, a village in Hudeşti Commune, Botoşani County, Romania
 Vatra, Teleorman County, a village in Troianul Commune, Teleorman County, Romania
 Vatra, Moldova, a town in the Municipality of Chişinău

Other
Vatra (literary magazine), a literary magazine published in Romania
Vatra (Slovak magazine), a Slovak magazine
Vatra (band), a Croatian rock band
Vatra (album), musical album of the band Divlje Jagode
Vatra, the Pan-Albanian Federation of America, an Albanian organization in USA

See also
Baro Vatra, a village in Bangladesh